Secret of the Runes is the tenth full-length musical album by Swedish symphonic metal band Therion. It's a concept album based on Norse mythology, where each song describes one of the nine worlds. Cover artwork was made by Thomas Ewerhard, it features nine Scandinavian runes, each corresponding to a certain mythological world.

Album also includes two cover versions as bonus tracks. A music video was filmed for the Summer Night City cover.

Track listing
All songs written by Christofer Johnsson.

Runes
Runes shown on the front cover (and also in the booklet) are Nordic runes with the Elder Futhark alphabet. On the back cover every song has its own rune character:

  "Ginnungagap (Prologue)"
  "Midgård"
  "Asgård"
  "Jotunheim"
  "Schwarzalbenheim"
  "Ljusalfheim"
  "Muspelheim"
  "Nifelheim"
  "Vanaheim"
  "Helheim"
  "Secret of the Runes (Epilogue)"

Secret of the Runes title is written in the Elder Futhark alphabet on the front cover as:

      ·   ·   ·     

and it is transliterated as: "sekret of þe runes".

Credits
Christofer Johnsson - rhythm guitar, keyboards, percussion, additional choir and orchestra arrangement on Bonus Tracks
Kristian Niemann - lead and rhythm guitar
Johan Niemann - bass guitar
Sami Karppinen - drums, percussion
Piotr Wawrzeniuk - lead vocals on "Crying Days" and "Summernight City"

Vocal and string soloists
Marika Schonberg - solo soprano
Erika Andersson - solo alto
Carl Rahmqvist - solo tenor-baritone
Anna Rodell - solo violin
Asa Akerberg - solo cello
Thomas Karlsson - whispering voice on "Ljusalfheim"

Choir
Kristina Hansson - coloratura soprano
Anna-Maria Krawe - soprano
Anna Artursson - alto
Marika Schonberg - alto
Henrik Holmberg - tenor
Patrik Forsman - tenor
Carl Rahmqvist - tenor-baritone
Joakim Berg - bass-baritone

String ensemble
Anna Rodell - first violin
Josef Cabrales-Alin - first violin
Malin Samuelsson - second violin
Johan Moren - second violin
Linda Svedrup - viola
Niklas Sjunesson - viola
Asa Akerberg - cello
Monica Jonsson - cello

Woodwinds (solo and ensemble)
Fareidah Hildebrand - flute, alt flute, piccolo
Erik Rodell - oboe, English horn
Henrik Blixt - bassoon, contrabassoon

Brass ensemble
Mikael Sorensen - trumpet, fluegelhorn
Ayman Al Fakir - horn, Wagner tuba
Kristina Borg - horn
Rune Bodin - trombone

Choir and orchestra on Bonus Tracks
 Anna Rodell - first violin
 Elisabeth Lagergren - second violin
 Petter Axelsson - viola
 Erik Rodell - oboe
 Ingela Bolin - soprano (ensemble and solo), alto
 Anna Artursson - soprano, alto
 Henrik Holmberg - tenor, baritone
 Pierre Pettersson - tenor (ensemble and solo), baritone

Charts

References

External links
 
 
 
 Information about album at the official website

2001 albums
Therion (band) albums
Concept albums
Nuclear Blast albums
Norse mythology in music